Dallas Jenkins (born July 25, 1975) is an American film and television director, writer and film producer. He is best known as the creator, director and co-writer of The Chosen, the first multi-season series about the life of Jesus of Nazareth.

Jenkins's career is focused on faith-based media. In an interview with the Chicago Sun Times, Jenkins said, "We feel like if people can binge watch and have watch parties all over the world for shows like Game of Thrones and Stranger Things, there's no reason not to binge watch a show about Jesus. The term binge means to, you know, kind of have an obsession with something, and if we figure out how to have an obsession with Jesus, we might as well encourage that."

Early life 
Jenkins’ father is Jerry B. Jenkins, a Christian novelist best known for the Left Behind series, one of the highest selling book series of all time, selling over 60 million copies.   In 1997, Jenkins graduated from University of Northwestern-St. Paul, where he met his wife, Amanda.

At the age of 25, Jenkins and his mother started a production company, Jenkins Entertainment, together. Their first film was Hometown Legend, a faith-based film which was distributed by Warner Brothers in 2000.

Jenkins is a former member of the Executive Leadership Team at Harvest Bible Chapel where he served as the Executive Director of Vertical Church Media. Vertical Church Films, a branch of Harvest Bible Chapel, partnered with Blumhouse Productions and WWE Films to produce the Jenkins’ directed The Resurrection of Gavin Stone, a 2017 faith-based film with a reported $2 million budget.

Career 
After producing Hometown Legend and directing two short films, Jenkins's feature-length directorial debut was Midnight Clear in 2006. The film, which starred Stephen Baldwin and was distributed by Lionsgate, was based on a short story written by his father, Jerry Jenkins.

In 2010, Jenkins directed What If…, a film about a businessman who is shown by an angel what his life could have become if he had followed God's calling for his life. It starred Kevin Sorbo, Kristy Swanson, John Ratzenberger, and Disney star Debby Ryan. Box Office Mojo reports the film made $814,906 domestically. It was successful internationally and continues to be successful via DVD and streaming.

In 2017, Jenkins directed The Resurrection of Gavin Stone, a 2017 American Christian comedy-drama. The movie featured Brett Dalton (Agents of S.H.I.E.L.D.), comedian Anjelah Johnson, D.B. Sweeney (The Cutting Edge), Neil Flynn (The Middle), and wrestling legend Shawn Michaels. The Hollywood Reporter said of the film "This genial religious-themed dramedy is refreshingly lacking in preachiness." However, it was not considered a box office success. Box Office Mojo reports the film made $2,308,355 gross worldwide.

In an interview with CBN News, Jenkins described it as his "biggest career failure". After this, Jenkins made a short film for his church in Elgin, Illinois, U.S., The Shepherd; filmed on a friend's farm in Marengo. The short film is about the birth of Christ from the point of view of the shepherds.

The film got the attention of the filtering and streaming service VidAngel, which was embroiled in a copyright infringement lawsuit with major Hollywood studios and thus seeking original content to distribute. VidAngel suggested putting the short film on Facebook as a concept pilot to generate interest for Jenkins' idea of a multi-season series. The short film received over 15 million views around the world.

Vertical Church Films

Vertical Church Films was launched in 2012 to produce Christian feature films. The ministry has produced four films: The Ride in 2012, Once We Were Slaves (retitled The Two Thieves) in 2014, The Resurrection of Gavin Stone in 2017, and The Shepherd in 2017. The Shepherd later became the pilot episode for Jenkins’ new TV show, The Chosen.

The Chosen

The Chosen is a 2018 television drama based on the life of Jesus Christ, created, directed and co-written by Jenkins.

It is the first multi-season series about the life of Christ, and season one was one of the highest crowd-funded media projects of all time. Season 2 and Season 3 have a budget of $12 million and $18 million respectively, each crowdfunded. The other co-founder of The Chosen, Derral Eves, was introduced to Jenkins and the two partnered to create and own The Chosen, with Eves as executive producer, primarily responsible for building the audience through their social media channels.

Jenkins owns a stake in the company but won’t share profits until the startup investors earn back their initial investment plus 20 percent.

In 2021, Jenkins directed a Christmas special episode of The Chosen, which was released in 1,700 cinemas for ten days. In April 2022, Jenkins apologized to fans for not informing them about a gag marketing campaign involving defacing their own billboards promoting The Chosen.

Personal life
Jenkins and his wife Amanda have four children, including one adopted from Thailand. He is an evangelical Christian.

References

External links

Living people
1975 births
21st-century evangelicals
American evangelicals
American film directors
American television directors
English-language film directors
University of Northwestern – St. Paul alumni